Suicidology is the scientific study of suicidal behaviour, the causes of suicidalness and suicide prevention. Every year, about one million people die by suicide, which is a mortality rate of sixteen per 100,000 or one death every forty seconds. Suicidologists believe that suicide is largely preventable with the right actions, knowledge about suicide, and a change in society's view of suicide to make it more acceptable to talk about suicide. There are many different fields and disciplines involved with suicidology, the two primary ones being psychology and sociology.

Short history
Most suicidologists think about the history of suicide in terms of courts, church, press, morals, and society. In Ancient Greece, there were several opinions about suicide. It was tolerated and even lauded when committed by patricians (generals and philosophers) but condemned if committed by  plebeians (common people) or slaves. In Rome, suicide was viewed rather neutrally, even positively because life was held cheaply. During early Christianity, excessive martyrdom and a penchant toward suicide frightened church elders sufficiently for them to introduce a serious deterrent. Suicide was thought of as a crime because it precluded possibility of repentance, and it violated the sixth commandment which is Thou shall not kill. During this time, St. Thomas Aquinas emphasized that suicide was a mortal sin because it disrupted God's power over man's life and death. However, nowhere in the Judeo-Christian Bible is there a directive forbidding suicide. This belief took hold and for hundreds of years thereafter played an important part in the Western view of suicide. Over the last 200 years, the main focus of suicide has moved from accusations that it is a sin to effort at compassion, understanding, and prevention.

Parts of study
There are many points of study within suicidology. Suicidology studies not only death by suicide and attempted suicide but also partial self-destruction, suicidal ideation, parasuicide, and self-destructive behaviors and attitudes. Suicidal ideation is when someone is having thoughts or showing gestures of suicide. For example, it could be as simple as someone saying that "life is not worth living any more" or it can be extreme as "I'm going to kill myself by jumping off a bridge." Parasuicide is when someone causes deliberate harm to themselves. For example, if someone were to take an overdose of medicine and live. Self-destructive behaviors are anything that cause harm to oneself. This can be intentional or unintentional. Some examples are alcoholism, risky sports, some sexual disorders, and eating disorders.   By way of a suicide note the person who is suiciding has the last word. It is also a way for the person to explain, bring closure (or not), to give guilt, to dictate wishes, to control, to forgive or to blame. Here is a list of the parts that might go into a suicide note.

Contributors
One of the first to contribute to the study of suicidology is Edwin S. Shneidman. Shneidman is considered to be the father of suicidology. Shneidman's definition of suicide is a conscious act of self-induced annihilation, best understood as a multidimensional malaise in a needful individual who defines an issue for which suicide is perceived as the best solution.  He thought of suicide as psychache or intolerable psychological pain. Another notable person in the field of suicidology is Emile Durkheim.  To Durkheim the word suicide is applied to all cases of death resulting directly or indirectly from a positive or negative act of the victim himself, which he knows will produce this result. Basically he saw suicide as an external and constraining social fact independent of individual psychopathology.

In David J. Mayo's definition there were four elements to suicide:

 A suicide has taken place only if a death has occurred.
 The death must be of one's own doing.
 The agency of suicide can be active or passive.
 It implies intentionally ending one's own life.

Sigmund Freud and Karl Menninger had similar views on suicide. Their definition of suicide had three different aspects. One was a murder involving hatred or the wish to kill. The second one was a murder by the self often involving guilt or the wish to be killed. The last one is the wish to die. They thought of suicide being a murderous death wish that was turned back upon one's own self. Freud also believed that we had two opposing basic instincts—life (eros) and death (thanatos)—and all instincts sought tension reduction. He also believed that suicide is more likely in advanced civilizations requiring greater repression of sexual and aggressive energy. Jean Baechler's definition of suicide was that suicide denotes all behavior that seeks and finds the solution to an existential problem by making an attempt on the life of the subject. Another worker in the field of suicidology was Joseph H. Davis. The definition he gave for suicide is a fatal willful self-inflicted life-threatening act without apparent desire to live; implicit are two basic components lethality and intent. Albert Camus also did some work in this field. He believed that whether one can live or chooses to live is the only truly serious philosophical problem. He also claimed that man created a god in order to be able to live without a wish to kill himself and that the only human liberty is to come to terms with death. He introduced Darwinian thought into his teachings.

Suicide myths
Here is a list of suicide myths and the truth behind these myths.

See also

 Suicide prevention
 Depression
 Euthanasia
 Psychology
 Psychiatry
Philosophy of suicide
List of suicides
 American Association of Suicidology

References

External links
 Samaritans Suicide info
 The Irish Association of Suicidology
 The National Suicide Research Foundation of Ireland
 The American Association of Suicidology

Journals related to suicidology
 Crisis: The Journal of Crisis Intervention and Suicide Prevention

Psychiatric research
Interdisciplinary subfields of sociology
Suicide prevention